The 1988 Honduran Segunda División was the 22nd season of the Honduran Segunda División.  Under the management of Roy Posas, Súper Estrella won the tournament after finishing first in the final round (or Cuadrangular) and obtained promotion to the 1989–90 Honduran Liga Nacional.

Final round
Also known as Cuadrangular.

Standings

Known results

References

Segunda
1988